Bayt Raqtah is a Syrian village located in Wadi al-Uyun Nahiyah in Masyaf District, Hama.  According to the Syria Central Bureau of Statistics (CBS), Bayt Raqtah had a population of was around 400 in the 2020 census , Considering that more than 1,000 of them are outside the village.

Daniel Muhammed .

References 

Populated places in Masyaf District